Sir John Davie Ferguson Davie, 2nd Baronet (27 October 1830 – 16 June 1907), known as John Ferguson until 1846, was a British Liberal politician, and British Army officer.

Family
Born Ferguson, he was the eldest son of Whig MP for Haddington Burghs Henry Ferguson Davie (then Henry Ferguson) and Frances Juliana Davie. He adopted the additional surname of Davie in 1846 at the same time as his parents. In 1857, he married Edwin Augusta Williams, daughter of Sir James Hamlyn-Williams and Lady Mary Fortescue, and they had at least one child: Mary Fanny Ferguson Davie (born 1857).

Military career
Ferguson Davie became a captain
in the Grenadier Guards in 1855, and in the same year fought in the Crimean War. He later became Lieutenant-Colonel commanding the 1st Devon Militia from 1858 to 1867.

Political career
He was elected Liberal MP for Barnstaple at the 1859 general election and held the seat until 1865 when he did not seek re-election.

Baronetcy
He inherited the title of Baronet of Creedy upon his father Henry Ferguson Davie's death on 30 November 1885.

Other activities
Ferguson Davie was also a Justice of the Peace for Devon, Somerset and Carmarthenshire, a Deputy Lieutenant for Devon and Carmarthenshire, and, in 1873, a High Sheriff of Carmarthenshire.

References

External links
 

UK MPs 1859–1865
1830 births
1907 deaths
Baronets in the Baronetage of the United Kingdom
Deputy Lieutenants of Devon
Deputy Lieutenants of Carmarthenshire
High Sheriffs of Carmarthenshire
Grenadier Guards officers
British Militia officers
Devon Militia officers
Liberal Party (UK) MPs for English constituencies
Members of the Parliament of the United Kingdom for Barnstaple